Hugh Lowell Montgomery (born August 26, 1944) is an American mathematician, working in the fields of analytic number theory and mathematical analysis. As a Marshall scholar, Montgomery earned his Ph.D. from the University of Cambridge. For many years, Montgomery has been teaching at the University of Michigan.

He is best known for Montgomery's pair correlation conjecture, his development of the large sieve methods and for co-authoring (with Ivan M. Niven and Herbert Zuckerman) one of the standard introductory number theory texts, An Introduction to the Theory of Numbers, now in its fifth edition.

In 1974 Montgomery was an invited speaker of the International Congress of Mathematicians (ICM) in Vancouver. In 2012 he became a fellow of the American Mathematical Society.

Bibliography
   
 Davenport, Harold. Multiplicative number theory. Third edition. Revised and with a preface by Hugh L. Montgomery. Graduate Texts in Mathematics, 74. Springer-Verlag, New York, 2000. xiv+177 pp. .
 Levinson, Norman; Montgomery, Hugh L. "Zeros of the derivatives of the Riemann zeta function". Acta Mathematica 133 (1974), 49–65. 
 Montgomery, Hugh L. Topics in multiplicative number theory. Lecture Notes in Mathematics, Vol. 227. Springer-Verlag, Berlin-New York, 1971. ix+178 pp.
 Montgomery, Hugh L. Ten lectures on the interface between analytic number theory and harmonic analysis. CBMS Regional Conference Series in Mathematics, 84. Published for the Conference Board of the Mathematical Sciences, Washington, DC; by the American Mathematical Society, Providence, RI, 1994. xiv+220 pp. .
 Montgomery, H. L.; Vaughan, R. C. The large sieve. Mathematika 20 (1973), 119–134. 
 Montgomery, Hugh L., and Vaughan, Robert C. Multiplicative number theory. I. Classical theory. Cambridge Studies in Advanced Mathematics, 97. Cambridge University Press, Cambridge, 2006. xviii+552 pp. ; 0-521-84903-9.
 Niven, Ivan; Zuckerman, Herbert S.; Montgomery, Hugh L. An introduction to the theory of numbers. Fifth edition. John Wiley & Sons, Inc., New York, 1991. xiv+529 pp.

References

External links
 Official Page
 An Introduction to the Theory of Numbers, Fifth Edition page

Number theorists
Alumni of the University of Cambridge
20th-century American mathematicians
21st-century American mathematicians
University of Michigan faculty
American Rhodes Scholars
1944 births
Living people
Fellows of the American Mathematical Society